Yellow Stockings is a 1928 British drama film directed by Theodore Komisarjevsky and starring Percy Marmont, Enid Stamp-Taylor, Marie Ault, and Georges Galli. It was based on a novel by Wilson McArthur and made at Cricklewood Studios.

Premise
After she unexpectedly receives a large inheritance, a young girl is besieged by fortune hunters.

Cast
 Percy Marmont - Gavin Sinclair
 Marjorie Mars - Iris Selton
 Georges Galli - Richard Trevor
 Enid Stamp-Taylor - Nellie Jackson
 Marie Ault - Countess
 Joseph R. Tozer - Tom Jackson
 Franklyn Bellamy - Menelos
 Lydia Sherwood - Erica
 May Calvin - Mona
 Elizabeth Kerr - Mrs Higgins

References

Bibliography
 Wood, Linda. British Films, 1927-1939. British Film Institute, 1986.

External links

1928 films
British drama films
British silent feature films
1928 drama films
Films shot at Cricklewood Studios
Films set in England
British black-and-white films
1920s English-language films
1920s British films
Silent drama films